Doing It is a young adult novel by author Melvin Burgess published in 2003. It is a story about the experiences of a group of English teenagers and their discovery of sex. It is told from the point of view of several young men as they learn about love, relationships, and loss.

Plot

The plot revolves around a group of British teenagers: Dino, who is the most popular guy at school, and his two best friends, Ben and Jonathon. Dino really likes a beautiful girl named Jackie, the most popular girl in school, but she is unwilling to give him what he wants. This gives Dino the chance to get it from other girls behind Jackie's back.  Yet problems arise in Dino's family that causes him to realize sex may not be what he needs. Jonathon likes Deborah, but she is overweight; fearing condemnation from his friends and because of a disgusting looking bump on his penis, he fears showing his true feelings. Ben has been secretly seeing his teacher, Miss Young. He used to love it, but now it overwhelms him. Ben tries to break it off in order to pursue a girl his own age but it causes big trouble for him, Miss Young and his new girlfriend.

Reception 
Reception to the book was generally favourable, with discussion of the subject matter being controversial for some.

In 2003 the author Anne Fine, the Children's Laureate, tried to use her influence to persuade Doing It'''s publisher to withdraw it on the grounds of obscenity, but it was not withdrawn, and the controversy increased its sales.

In 2017, many UK school librarians refused to stock the book or lend it to students due to controversial material.

Awards and nominations
Won the Los Angeles Times Book Prize for Young Adult Fiction in 2004
Named to the New York Public Library Books for the Teenage list

TV series adaptation
The book was adapted as a TV series under the title Life As We Know It'', which, although critically acclaimed, was cancelled.

References

External links
Reviews of the novel on Goodreads.com

2003 British novels
2003 children's books
Novels by Melvin Burgess
British young adult novels
Andersen Press books